St Peter's is an area of Broadstairs, a town on the Isle of Thanet in Kent. Historically a village, it was outgrown by the long-dominant settlement of the two, Broadstairs, after 1841. Originally the borough or manor of the church of St. Peter-in-Thanet, it was said to be the largest parish east of London, at least until Broadstairs became a separate parish on 27 September 1850. The two settlements were formally merged administratively in 1895.

History
The village and its church, named after Saint Peter, was the second daughter church of Minster established in 1070, although the first written record of its present name dates to 1124. In 1254 the village was named "scī Petr'", which gradually changed to "scī  Petri" by 1270, Sti Petri in Insula de Thaneto by 1422, and finally settling by 1610 on its current form of St Peter's. The church has the right to fly the white ensign, dating from when the church tower was used as a signalling station in the Napoleonic Wars.  The village sign won first prize in a nationwide competition in 1920. Edward Heath, leader of the Conservative Party from 1965 to 1975, serving as prime minister from 1970 to 1974, was born in the village in 1916. On 27 April 1952 a United States Air Force Republic F-84 Thunderjet from RAF Manston crashed in the main street with loss of life.

Demography

At the 2001 UK census, the St Peter's electoral ward had a population of 6,761. The ethnicity was 97.8% white, 0.7% mixed race, 1.2% Asian, 0.2% black and 0.1% other. The place of birth of residents was 95.7% United Kingdom, 0.7% Republic of Ireland, 0.9% other Western European countries, and 2.7% elsewhere. Religion was recorded as 75.7% Christian, 0.5% Buddhist, 0.3% Hindu, 0% Sikh, 0.1% Jewish, and 0.3% Muslim. 14% were recorded as having no religion, 0.4% had an alternative religion and 8.6% did not state their religion.

The economic activity of residents aged 16–74 was 38% in full-time employment, 13.6% in part-time employment, 9% self-employed, 2.8% unemployed, 2.2% students with jobs, 3.9% students without jobs, 19.2% retired, 5.7% looking after home or family, 3.3% permanently sick or disabled and 2.3% economically inactive for other reasons. The industry of employment of residents was 16.1% retail, 14.9% manufacturing, 7.2% construction, 9.3% real estate, 13.2% health and social work, 12.1% education, 7.3% transport and communications, 5.5% public administration, 4.7% hotels and restaurants, 2.5% finance, 1% agriculture and 6.2% other. Compared with national figures, the ward had a relatively high proportion of workers in education and health and social work. There were a relatively low proportion in agriculture, real estate and finance. Of the ward's residents aged 16–74, 15.5% had a higher education qualification or the equivalent, compared with 19.9% nationwide.

References

External links

Broadstairs and St. Peter's Town Council

Broadstairs